Temporary Highs in the Violet Skies (stylized in all caps) is the third studio album by Los Angeles-based Swedish singer Snoh Aalegra. It was released on 9 July 2021 through ARTium and Roc Nation.

The album received a nomination for Best R&B Album at the 64th Annual Grammy Awards.

Track listing

Notes
 All tracks are stylised in all caps.

Charts

Release history

References

2019 albums
Snoh Aalegra albums
Albums produced by the Neptunes
Albums produced by Tyler, the Creator
Albums produced by No I.D.
Albums produced by Christian Rich